Myosin regulatory light chain 12A is a protein that in humans is encoded by the MYL12A gene.

References

Further reading